This is a list of scientific journals which cover the field of zoology.

A
 Acta Entomologica Musei Nationalis Pragae
 Acta Zoologica Academiae Scientiarum Hungaricae
 Acta Zoologica Bulgarica
 Acta Zoologica Mexicana
 Acta Zoologica: Morphology and Evolution
 African Entomology
 African Invertebrates
African Journal of Herpetology
 African Zoology
 Alces
 American Journal of Primatology
 Animal Biology, formerly Netherlands Journal of Zoology
 Animal Cognition
 Arctic
 Australian Journal of Zoology
 Australian Mammalogy

B
 Bulletin of the American Museum of Natural History

C
 Canadian Journal of Zoology
 Caribbean Herpetology
 Central European Journal of Biology
 Contributions to Zoology
 Copeia
 Crustaceana

E
 Environmental Biology of Fishes

F
 Frontiers in Zoology

H
 Herpetological Monographs

I
 Integrative and Comparative Biology, formerly American Zoologist
 International Journal of Acarology
 International Journal of Primatology

J

M
 Malacologia

N
 North-Western Journal of Zoology

P
 Physiological and Biochemical Zoology

R
 Raffles Bulletin of Zoology
 Rangifer
 Russian Journal of Nematology

V
 The Veliger

W
 Worm Runner's Digest

Z

See also
List of biology journals
List of ornithology journals
List of entomology journals

Lists of academic journals
 
 
Zoology-related lists